Josef Boháč (20 April 1914 – 12 September 1989) was a Czech ice hockey player. He competed for Czechoslovakia in the men's tournament at the 1936 Winter Olympics.

References

External links
 
 

1914 births
1989 deaths
Ice hockey players at the 1936 Winter Olympics
Olympic ice hockey players of Czechoslovakia
Ice hockey people from Prague
Czech ice hockey goaltenders
Czechoslovak ice hockey goaltenders